The 1916 Rice Owls football team was an American football team that represented Rice University as a member of the Southwest Conference (SWC) during the 1916 college football season. In its fifth season under head coach Philip Arbuckle, the team compiled a 6–1–2 record (2–1 against SWC opponents) and outscored opponents by a total of 346 to 62.

On November 17, 1916, the team scored 146 points against SMU. This remains the single-game scoring record for a Rice football team. Rice scored 23 touchdowns in the game, including six by left halfback Griffith Vance. The Houston Daily Post wrote that Vance's work was the "outstanding feature of the game", describing a "wonderful side step" and "quick change of pace" that enabled him to run through the entire SMU team several times for touchdowns.

Schedule

References

Rice
Rice Owls football seasons
Rice Owls football